Brenna Huckaby (born January 22, 1996) is an American snowboarder. She competed at the 2018 Winter Paralympics, winning gold medals in the snowboard cross and banked slalom, and she won gold and a bronze medal at the 2022 Winter Paralympics. She is the first Paralympian to appear in the Swimsuit Issue of Sports Illustrated.

Early life and education
Huckaby has two brothers. She was a nationally ranked gymnast. She learned to snowboard at age 15 at the National Ability Center. While still in school, Huckaby moved to Utah to pursue snowboarding.

Snowboarding career
Huckaby won her first world championship in snowboarding in 2015. She won world championships in both snowboard-cross and banked slalom in 2017. Huckaby is the first Paralympian to appear in Sports Illustrated's Swimsuit issue.

She competed at the 2018 Winter Paralympics, winning gold medals in both the snowboard cross and banked slalom.

She won the gold medal in the women's dual banked slalom SB-LL1 event at the 2021 World Para Snow Sports Championships held in Lillehammer, Norway. She also won the silver medal in the women's snowboard cross SB-LL1 event.

Huckaby is classified as a SB-LL1 snowboarder. In January 2022, she won a court decision to allow her to compete at the 2022 Winter Paralympics; this was previously not permitted as there are no SB-LL1 events for female snowboarders in the snowboarding programme. She won the gold medal in the women's banked slalom SB-LL2 event. She also won the bronze medal in the women's snowboard cross SB-LL2 event.

Personal life
She is married to Tristan Clegg. Huckaby gave birth to her daughter Lilah in 2016. She gave birth to her second daughter Sloan in 2020.

References

External links
 
 
 Brenna Huckaby at World Para Snowboard

1996 births
Living people
American female snowboarders
Paralympic snowboarders of the United States
Paralympic medalists in snowboarding
Paralympic gold medalists for the United States
Paralympic bronze medalists for the United States
Snowboarders at the 2018 Winter Paralympics
Snowboarders at the 2022 Winter Paralympics
Medalists at the 2018 Winter Paralympics
Medalists at the 2022 Winter Paralympics
Sportspeople from Baton Rouge, Louisiana
21st-century American women